The Dürrenhorn (4,035 m) (also Dirruhorn) is a summit in the Pennine Alps in Switzerland. It lies towards the northern end of the Nadelgrat, a high-level ridge running roughly north–south above the resort of Saas-Fee to the east, and the Mattertal to the west. It is part of the Mischabel range, which culminates at the Dom (4,545 m).

See also

List of 4000 metre peaks of the Alps

References

External links
Dürrenhorn on SummitPost

Alpine four-thousanders
Mountains of the Alps
Mountains of Valais
Pennine Alps
Mountains of Switzerland
Four-thousanders of Switzerland